Top TV Network is brand of a network of 5 local television stations in East Indonesia.

Top TV Papua airs from 11 AM until 11 PM every day. Top TV Papua is led by Dr. M. Yohanis Koroh, as President Director. In 2014, Top TV Papua merged with Jaya TV Manokwari into Jaya TV Jayapura.

Television stations in Indonesia
Mass media in Jayapura